Admiral Pedro Porter y Casanate (April 30, 1611 – February 27, 1662) was a Spanish sailor, soldier, explorer of California and Royal Governor of Chile from 1656 to 1662.

Early life
Porter was born in Zaragoza, the second son of Juan Porter and Esperanza Casanate. In 1627, he joined the Spanish Navy, and under Admiral Fadrique de Toledo participated in the expedition against La Rochelle. The year after, he joined the fleet of Admiral Francisco de Vallecilla, charged with protecting the silver galleons from pirate attacks. In 1629, he travelled to the new world for the first time, to fight against the British that had occupied the islands of Saint Kitts and Nevis, taking part in several conflicts in his time and in numerous naval expeditions in the Indies, as a consequence of which he was promoted to alférez in 1631, and sea captain in 1634. The same year, he published his first book on naval themes, the Correction to mistakes of the Spanish navigation.

Later he would become an admiral of the South Seas fleet. He was knight of the Order of Santiago.

Explorations
In 1635, he applied for and got from the Viceroy of New Spain marquis de Cerralvo a license to explore California, a territory that although located within the borders of the Spanish Empire was unknown whether it was an island or peninsula. Nonetheless, problems and suspicions about his intentions led to the confiscation of his ships. In 1636, he tried again, this time with the license and economic sponsorship of Viceroy marquis de Cadereyta.

In 1643 king Philip IV relieved him from his position in the Navy, ordering him to explore California. That same year he left from Cadiz for Cartagena de Indias, from where he left for Veracruz, and crossing the continent he arrived on the west coast of Mexico;  where he would remain until 1649, exploring and colonizing the area of the Gulf of California.

Considered as an expert in naval matters, his treatises were appreciated at the time. Among them were: Diccionario náutico, Hidrografía general, Arte de navegar.

Governor of Chile 
In 1656 he was designated as governor of the Captaincy General of Chile, in whose functions he took part in the Arauco War against the Mapuche. During his government he founded the fortress of San Miguel Arcángel de Colcura, built southeast of the modern city of Lota on the site of the old Fort Colcura in the valley of Colcura. He would remain in this position until his death in 1662 in Concepción due to edema.

Additional information

References

Sources

1610 births
1662 deaths
Royal Governors of Chile
Knights of Santiago
Spanish admirals
Spanish generals
17th-century Spanish people